The Focke-Wulf S 2 was a trainer aircraft built in Germany in the late 1920s. It was a conventional parasol-wing monoplane with fixed tailskid undercarriage. The pilot and instructor sat side by side in an open cockpit. Only a single example was built.

Specifications (S 2)

References

Further reading

External links
 German aircraft between 1919 and 1945

1920s German civil trainer aircraft
S 02
Single-engined tractor aircraft
Parasol-wing aircraft
Aircraft first flown in 1928